Samuel Kanyon Doe (6 May 1951 – 9 September 1990) was a Liberian politician who served as the 21st president of Liberia from 1980 to 1990. Doe ruled Liberia as Chairman of the People's Redemption Council (PRC) from 1980 to 1984 and then as president from 1985 to 1990.

Doe was a master sergeant in the Armed Forces of Liberia (AFL) when he staged the violent 1980 coup d'état that overthrew President William Tolbert and the True Whig Party, becoming the first non-Americo-Liberian leader of Liberia and ending 133 years of Americo-Liberian rule. Doe suspended the Constitution of Liberia, assumed the rank of general, and established the PRC as a provisional military government with himself as de facto head of state. Doe dissolved the PRC in 1984, and attempted to legitimize his regime with a new constitution and being elected president in the 1985 general election, which he won despite evidence of election fraud. Doe opened Liberian ports to Canadian, Chinese and European ships which brought in considerable foreign investment and earned Liberia's reputation as a tax haven. Doe had support from the United States due to his anti-Soviet stance during the Cold War. 

Doe's rule was characterized by totalitarianism, corruption, and his favoritism towards ethnic Krahns, which led to growing opposition to his regime from the Liberian public and the United States. The First Liberian Civil War began in December 1989 when the anti-Doe National Patriotic Front of Liberia (NPFL) led by Charles Taylor invaded Liberia from the Ivory Coast to overthrow him. Doe was captured and executed by Prince Johnson in September 1990.

Early life 
Samuel Kanyon Doe was born on 6 May 1951 in Tuzon, a small inland village in Grand Gedeh County. His family belonged to the Krahn people, a minority indigenous group important in this area. At the age of sixteen, Doe finished elementary school and enrolled at a Baptist junior high school in Zwedru. 
Two years later, he enlisted in the Armed Forces of Liberia, hoping thereby to obtain a scholarship to a high school in Kakata, but instead he was assigned to military duties. Over the next ten years, he was assigned to a range of duty stations, including education at a military school and commanding an assortment of garrisons and prisons in Monrovia. He finally completed high school by correspondence. Doe was promoted to the grade of Master sergeant on 11 October 1979 and made an administrator for the Third Battalion in Monrovia, a position which he occupied for eleven months.

1980 bloody coup d'etat and new government 

 Commanding a group of Krahn soldiers, Master Sergeant Samuel Doe led a military coup on 12 April 1980 by attacking the Liberian Executive Mansion and killing President William R. Tolbert Jr. His forces killed another 26 of Tolbert's supporters in the fighting. Thirteen members of the Cabinet were publicly executed ten days later. Shortly after the coup, government ministers were walked publicly around Monrovia in the nude and then summarily executed by a firing squad on the beach. The convicted were denied the right to a lawyer or to any appeal. Hundreds of government workers fled the country, while others were imprisoned.

After the coup, Doe assumed the rank of general and established a People's Redemption Council (PRC), composed of himself and 14 other low-ranking officers, to rule the country. The early days of the regime were marked by mass executions of members of Tolbert's deposed government. Doe ordered the release of about 50 leaders of the opposition Progressive People's Party, who had been jailed by Tolbert during the rice riots of the previous month.

Shortly after that, Doe ordered the arrest of 91 officials of the Tolbert regime. Within days, 11 former members of Tolbert's cabinet, including his brother Frank, were brought to trial to answer charges of "high treason, rampant corruption and gross violation of human rights." Doe suspended the Constitution, allowing these trials to be conducted by a Commission appointed by the state's new military leadership, with defendants being refused both legal representation and trial by jury, virtually ensuring their conviction.

Doe abruptly ended 133 years of Americo-Liberian political domination. Some hailed the coup as the first time since Liberia's establishment as a country that it was governed by people of native African descent instead of by the Americo-Liberian elite. Other persons without Americo-Liberian heritage had held the Vice Presidency (Henry Too Wesley), as well as Ministerial and Legislative positions in years prior. Many people welcomed Doe's takeover as a shift favoring the majority of the population that had largely been excluded from participation in government since the establishment of the country.

However, the new government, led by the leaders of the coup d'état and calling itself the People's Redemption Council (PRC), lacked experience and was ill-prepared to rule. Doe became head of state and suspended the constitution, but promised a return to civilian rule by 1985.

In the first alleged plot against his government, nine military personnel arrested two months after the original 1980 coup were reportedly jailed for life.

In June 1981, his government denounced another alleged coup in which thirteen members were executed behind closed doors.

Months later, Thomas Weh Syen, an outspoken critic of some of Doe's policies, including the closure months before of the Libyan diplomatic mission and the forced reduction of staff from fifteen to six at the Soviet embassy, was beaten and arrested on 12 August of that same year, along with four other officers. They were promised a defense attorney but none was given, and in three days they were executed, which caused panic in the citizens of the capital.

Theories on the genesis of the coup 
In August 2008, before a Truth and Reconciliation Commission (TRC) in Monrovia, Doe's former justice minister, Councillor Chea Cheapoo — who contested the 2011 Liberia Presidential elections — alleged the American CIA had provided a map of the Executive Mansion, enabling the rebels to break into it; that it was a white American CIA agent who shot and killed Tolbert; and that the Americans "were responsible for Liberia’s nightmare". However, the next day, before the same TRC, another former minister of Samuel Doe, Dr. Boima Fahnbulleh, testified that "the Americans did not support the coup led by Mr. Doe".

Some facts of the 1980 coup are still clouded by reports of an "Unknown Soldier". It is reported that an "unknown soldier" was one of the "white" mercenaries who would have staged the 1980 military takeover of the state. According to the autobiography of Tolbert's wife Victoria, the First Lady witnessed a masked man with a "white" hand stabbing her late husband.

Presidency 
During his rule, Doe portrayed himself as an enlightened leader whose actions were intended to bring "relief to many".  He styled himself "Dr. Doe" starting in 1982, after making a state visit to Chun Doo-hwan in South Korea and being awarded an honorary doctorate from the University of Seoul.  After seven years of calling himself a doctor, Doe announced in 1989 that he had completed a bachelor's degree from the University of Liberia.

Relations with the United States 

During his first years in office, Doe openly supported U.S. Cold War foreign policy in Africa during the 1980s, severing diplomatic relations between Liberia and the Soviet Union.

The United States valued Liberia as an important ally during the Cold War, as it helped to contain the spread of Soviet influence in Africa. As part of the expanding relationship, Doe agreed to a modification of the mutual defense pact granting staging rights on 24-hour notice at Liberia's sea and airports for the U.S. Rapid Deployment Forces, which were established to respond swiftly to security threats around the world.

New constitution and 1985 elections 
A draft constitution providing for a multi-party republic was issued in 1983 and approved by referendum in 1984. On 26 July 1984, Doe was elected President of the Interim National Assembly. He had a new constitution approved by referendum in 1984 and went on to stage a presidential election on 15 October 1985.  According to official figures, Doe won 51% of the vote—just enough to avoid a runoff.  The NDPL won 21 of the 26 Senate seats and 51 of the 64 seats in the House of Representatives. However, most of the elected opposition candidates refused to take their seats.

The election was heavily rigged; Doe had the ballots taken to a secret location and 50 of his own handpicked staff counted them. Foreign observers declared the elections fraudulent and suggested that runner-up Jackson Doe of the Liberian Action Party had actually won. Also, prior to the election he had more than 50 of his political opponents murdered. It is also alleged that he changed his official birth date from 1951 to 1950 in order to meet the new constitution's requirement that the president be at least 35 years old. Doe was formally sworn in on 6 January 1986. On the day of his inauguration as twenty-first president, in the stadium a show with several Liberian girls danced artistically in his honor with various hoops, later the dancers danced with maracas, finally the army paraded in line and in the first they played a majestic orchestra.

Doe publicly declared that if he lost the elections, he would not hand over power and the army would carry out another coup in less than two weeks, a position that was harshly criticized by the international community and the political parties participating in the elections. Official results showed that Doe received a narrow majority of the votes cast in the elections, although the US State department alleged widespread fraud.

Increased repression 
General Thomas Quiwonkpa, who had been a leader of the 1980 coup along with Doe, attempted to seize power on 12 November 1985; the attempt failed after fighting in Monrovia in which Quiwonkpa was killed. Doe also announced in a radio and television broadcast that anyone found on the streets after a 6 p.m. curfew would be considered a rebel and executed immediately.

Doe's corrupt and totalitarian government became even more repressive after the attempted coup, shutting down newspapers and banning political activity. The government's mistreatment of certain ethnic groups, particularly the Gio (or Dan) and the Mano in the north (Quiwonkpa was an ethnic Gio), resulted in divisions and violence among indigenous populations who until then had coexisted peacefully.

Civil war 

Charles Taylor, a former ally of Doe, crossed into Liberia from  Ivory Coast on 24 December 1989, to wage a guerrilla war against Doe. Taylor had broken out of a jail in the United States, where he was awaiting extradition to Liberia on charges of embezzlement. The conflict quickly flared into full-fledged civil war. By mid-1990, most of Liberia was controlled by rebel factions.

Approximately 600 civilians were killed at the church in the Sinkor section of Monrovia on 29 July 1990. The massacre was carried out by approximately 30 government soldiers loyal to President Samuel Doe. The perpetrators were of Doe's Krahn tribe while most of the victims were from the Gio and Mano tribes, which were in support of the rebels.

Capture
Doe was captured in Monrovia on 9 September 1990, by Prince Y. Johnson, leader of INPFL, a breakaway faction of Taylor's NPFL. General Quinoo, the head of ECOMOG, had invited Doe to the ECOMOG headquarters for a meeting and assured him of his safety from the rebels. On the morning of 9 September 1990, Doe arrived at a precarious time during an ongoing change in guard duty from the well-armed and better equipped Nigerian team of peacekeepers to the weaker Gambian contingent. The Nigerian team had just withdrawn from the scene when Doe's convoy of lightly armed personnel arrived. Doe was escorted to General Quinoo's office where he was formally welcomed, while most of his team of aides and guards waited outside. Johnson's rebels surprised everyone by suddenly arriving on the scene uninvited and heavily armed, overwhelming and disarming the entirety of Doe's team while encountering no resistance. They then started shooting Doe's team individually and later in groups. Upon hearing the gunshots from outside, Doe expressed concern to Quinoo, who assured him that all was fine. Quinoo later excused himself to check on what was happening outside and was followed by his aide, Captain Coker of the Gambian contingent. Both men took cover upon assessing the situation. Johnson's men moved indoors, finished off Doe's remaining team, shot him in the leg, and took him captive. When the dust settled, over 80 of Doe's men lay dead. Coker characterized the incident not as a fight, but a brutal massacre. Remarkably, none of the ECOMOG personnel were shot in the carnage.

Torture and murder
Doe was taken to Johnson's military base. To prove that he was not protected by black magic, Johnson ordered Doe's ears be cut off in his presence. Shackles were also placed around Doe's legs and something strange was tied around his glans, as can be seen in the recording. At the end of the recording Doe was forced to get up, some of his fingers and toes were also amputated, and there were attempts to mutilate the middle finger. After 12 hours of torture at Johnson's hands, Doe was finally murdered; his corpse had its head shaved and was exhibited naked in the streets of Monrovia with cigarette burns. Doe's body was later exhumed and reburied. The spectacle of his torture was video-taped and seen on news reports around the country. The video shows Johnson sipping a beer as Doe's ear is cut off.

Personal life 
Doe was a Baptist. At one time, he was a member of the First Baptist Church in the town of Zwedru in Grand Gedeh County. He changed his church membership to the Providence Baptist Church of Monrovia on 1 December 1985. Doe was a passionate football fan, and the Samuel Kanyon Doe Sports Complex bears his name.

Posterity
In November 2000, at a religious rally representing the Doe family, Doe's son Samuel Kanyon Doe Jr; accompanied by his mother Nancy, President Doe's widow, told a conference that he had feelings of hatred and resentment against "a certain person in particular", thoughts of revenge against his father's murderer for the past 10 years and that he intended to cleanse his sins and feelings of hatred and revenge against his father's executioner. Both parties were reconciled at the hand of the Nigerian Reverend Pastor T. B. Joshua.

References

External links 
 

1951 births
1990 deaths
1990 murders in Africa
Assassinated heads of government
Assassinated heads of state
Assassinated Liberian politicians
Executed presidents
Field marshals
Krahn people
Leaders who took power by coup
Liberian anti-communists
Liberian Baptists
National Democratic Party of Liberia politicians
People executed by torture
People from Grand Gedeh County
People murdered in Liberia
People's Redemption Council
Presidents of Liberia
Filmed executions
20th-century Baptists
20th-century Liberian politicians